Tyrell Baringer-Tahiri (born 20 April 1994) is a Cook Islands footballer who plays as a defender for AFC South London and the Cook Islands national football team. He made his debut for the national team on 31 August 2015 in a 3–0 win against Tonga.

Baringer-Tahiri was educated at Otago Boys' High School. After playing for Southern United in the youth league, in 2016 he switched to Tasman United. In 2019 he played for Tupapa Maraerenga F.C. in the 2019 OFC Champions League.

In March 2022 he was named to the Cook Islands squad for the Oceania FIFA World Cup 2022.

References

External links
 

Living people
1994 births
Association football defenders
Cook Islands international footballers
Cook Island footballers
Association footballers from Dunedin